Cry is Ronnie Dove's fifth studio album (and sixth album release) for Diamond Records.

History
The album was released on the strength of his version of the Johnnie Ray song Cry.  The title song earned Ronnie an appearance on The Ed Sullivan Show. The album also features the charting single One More Mountain to Climb, which hit the charts in early 1967.

Release
The original album was issued in both stereo and mono.  Columbia Records Club also issued the album at the time.  The album was reissued on CD in the mid 1990s by Collectables Records, and digitally in 2018 by Ronnie Dove Music.
The album peaked at number 121 on the Billboard 200 chart.

Track listing

References

1967 albums
Ronnie Dove albums